is a Japanese musician and multi-instrumentalist. He plays primarily keyboards and guitar.
Horie is one half of the Shibuya-kei duo Neil & Iraiza, and is known for his work with artists such as Kahimi Karie and Cornelius (as a member of the Cornelius Group).

Biography 
While a student of Tama Art University, Horie participated in many musicians' live performances and in recording sessions as a session keyboardist.

Horie has been very active as a musician, having performed and/or recorded with Japanese and international artists including Acrobat Bunche, American Rock, Billy No Mates, Chocolat, Cocco, Cubismo Grafico, Curly Giraffe, El-Malo, Freedom Suite, Great3, Hideki Kaji, Kaela Kimura, Kahimi Karie, Love Psychedelico, Master Low, Pizzicato Five, Plagues, Quruli, Snapshot, Studio Apes, and many others.

Horie has been a long-time collaborator with Keigo Oyamada (Cornelius), performing live as a member of his Cornelius Group.  The two have worked together for over 15 years, since the time that Oyamada still presided over his record label Trattoria Records.

In 1995, Horie formed Neil & Iraiza with Gakuji Matsuda, serving as a vocalist and the group’s keyboardist.

In 2005, Horie formed Singer Songer with Shigeru Kishida of Quruli, Cocco and others, releasing one single and one album.

In the summer of 2007, Horie was invited by Yukihiro Takahashi of Yellow Magic Orchestra to form the pop electronica band pupa.

Horie is a member of the band the Hiatus.  In 2009, he joined the group as its keyboardist. He produced all the group’s songs in collaboration with Takeshi Hosomi, the former lead vocalist of Ellegarden, and performed with the band live at concerts and festivals.

He is featured on the song "One Thousand 20th Century Chairs" from Kahimi Karie's album K.K.K.K.K..

Discography

American Rock
  Light in the Darkness  (1997)

Billy No Mates
  C'monletmeseeyoupogo (2006)

Chocolat
  À la Mode (1997)
  Twinkle Starberry (1998)
  One Too Many (1998)
  Hamster (1999)

Cocco
 Cocco-san no Daidokoro CD (2009, produce)

Cornelius
  69/96 (1995)

Cubismo Grafico
  Untitled (But One Wish) (2002)

Hideki Kaji
  Muscat E.P. (1996)
  Mini Skirt (1997)
  Eggstone (Single Version) (1997)
  Koibito ga Matteiru (1997)
  August E.P. (1998)
  Tea (1999)
  15 Angry Men (1999)
  Ivy Ivory Ivy (2000)
  My Love, My Milk (2001)
  From Café Scandinavia With Love~For Café Après Midi (2001)
  Separate Ways (2001)

Kahimi Karie
  K.K.K.K.K. (1998)

Neil & Iraiza
  I ♥ NY (1996)
  Je suis ému E.P. (1997)
  Johnny Marr? (1997)
  Juillet (1999)
  Wasted Time (2000)
  New School (2002)

Pizzicato Five
  Romantique 96 (1995)
  Sister Freedom Tapes (1997)
  Pizzicato Five (1999)

pupa
 floating pupa (2008)

Singer Songer
  Barairo Pop (2005)

Snapshot
  Icerink (1996)

The Hiatus
 Trash We'd Love (2009, produce)

References

External links 
[ Hirohisa Horie's at allmusic]
Hirohisa Horie at Shibuyalink

Japanese record producers
Japanese electronic musicians
Shibuya-kei musicians
Japanese guitarists
Living people
1970 births
Japanese keyboardists
21st-century guitarists